Sovremennyi Gumanitarnyi University is a university in Omsk, Russia.

Omsk
Universities in Omsk Oblast